Dominique G. Homberger (born 10 April 1948) is an Alumni Professor the Louisiana State University, where she taught for 31 years. She is noted for her work on the evolution of complex structures in birds, mammals, and fish, and is also the author of a textbook on vertebrate dissection.  A fellow of the American Association for the Advancement of Science and the American Ornithological Union, she served as the President of the International Ornithological Congress 2022, and President of the International Ornithologists' Union from 2018-2022.

Teaching 
In 2016, the Louisiana State University Honors College awarded Homberger the Departmental Alumni Professorship.

In 2010, Dr. Homberger was removed from teaching her biology courses at LSU, where she was a tenured biology professor at the time, presumably for having a strict grading policy. At the same time, a nontenured researcher was fired for criticizing the New Orleans levee system. As a result of these two dismissals, the American Association of University Professors released a report, accusing LSU of violating academic freedom and due process. Cary Nelson, president of the American Association of University Professors, observed that the academic community has always believed that "an instructor has the responsibility for assigning grades", and there was media speculation that this was part of a process of formalizing grade inflation.

Book 
With co-author Warren F. Walker, Homberger has written a standard textbook titled "Vertebrate Dissection". This was first published in 2003 and is now in the ninth edition.  Goodreads has a rating of 4.4 out of 5.

Works

References 

Living people
American ornithologists
Women ornithologists
Fellows of the American Association for the Advancement of Science
1948 births